Luciano "Chuzito" González (born 1 January 1990) is an Argentine basketball player who currently plays with Instituto in the Liga Nacional de Básquet.

Professional career
On 13 July 2019, González was announced by defending Argentine champions San Lorenzo. On 13 March, he scored 14 points in a quarterfinal win over Quimsa in the BCL Americas.

On 10 July 2020, González signed with Flamengo in Brazil.

National team career
In 2011, González made his debut for the Argentine national basketball team.

References

External links
Profile at RealGM

1990 births
Living people
Argentine men's basketball players
Shooting guards
San Lorenzo de Almagro (basketball) players
Instituto ACC basketball players
Atenas basketball players
Quimsa basketball players
Obras Sanitarias basketball players
Juventud Sionista basketball players
La Unión basketball players
Flamengo basketball players
Sportspeople from Entre Ríos Province